Saint Paul Cathedral is the mother church of the Diocese of Pittsburgh in Pittsburgh, Pennsylvania.  St. Paul's parish was established in 1833.

History
The original St. Paul's was dedicated in 1833.
When the diocese was established in 1843 St. Paul's Church was chosen as the cathedral. It burnt down in 1851, but was replaced with a larger building in 1855.  The first two St. Paul Cathedrals were located on Grant Street downtown. As the downtown area was claimed by industries, the residential areas shifted to other areas of the city.  St. Paul's property was sold to the industrialist Henry Clay Frick.  

The present Gothic Revival structure was designed by Egan and Prindeville of Chicago and completed in 1906.  They used Cologne Cathedral as their inspiration.  Philadelphia contractor Thomas Reilly built the new cathedral in the Oakland neighborhood.  A pipe organ was provided by Andrew Carnegie.  The cathedral serves the spiritual needs of approximately 3,000 worshipers.  It became a contributing property in the Schenley Farms Historic District on the National Register of Historic Places in 1983.

Andrew Carnegie provided the cathedral's first pipe organ, originally a circa 1895 W. W. Kimball, which served into the 1950s. Under organist and choirmaster Paul Koch's leadership, the cathedral contracted with Aeolian-Skinner to build a new large four-manual organ. This contract fell through upon the death of Aeolian-Skinner's president G. Donald Harrison, and after a tour of European organ manufacturers Koch selected Beckerath to manufacture the cathedral's new organ. Named "one of the monument organs of the continent", it was completed in 1962, and has undergone several major refurbishment projects since.

Gallery

See also

List of Catholic cathedrals in the United States
List of cathedrals in the United States

References

External links

 Official Cathedral Site
 Roman Catholic Diocese of Pittsburgh Official Site

Religious organizations established in 1834
Roman Catholic churches completed in 1906
Paul Pittsburgh
Gothic Revival church buildings in Pennsylvania
Roman Catholic churches in Pittsburgh
Cathedrals in Pittsburgh
Historic district contributing properties in Pennsylvania
National Register of Historic Places in Pittsburgh
1834 establishments in Pennsylvania
20th-century Roman Catholic church buildings in the United States